A pseudo-polyomino, also called a polyking, polyplet or hinged polyomino, is a plane geometric figure formed by joining one or more equal squares edge-to-edge or corner-to-corner at 90°. It is a polyform with square cells. The polyominoes are a subset of the polykings.

The name "polyking" refers to the king in chess. The n-kings are the n-square shapes which could be occupied by a king on an infinite chessboard in the course of legal moves.

Golomb uses the term pseudo-polyomino referring to kingwise-connected sets of squares.

Enumeration of polykings

Free, one-sided, and fixed polykings 
There are three common ways of distinguishing polyominoes and polykings for enumeration:
free polykings are distinct when none is a rigid transformation (translation, rotation, reflection or glide reflection) of another (pieces that can be picked up and flipped over).
one-sided polykings are distinct when none is a translation or rotation of another (pieces that cannot be flipped over).
fixed polykings are distinct when none is a translation of another (pieces that can be neither flipped nor rotated).

The following table shows the numbers of polykings of various types with n cells.

Notes

External links

Polyforms
Recreational mathematics